Norbert Felix Gaughan (May 30, 1921 – October 1, 1999) was an American prelate of the Roman Catholic Church.  He served as an auxiliary bishop of Diocese of Greensburg in Pennsylvania from 1975 to 1984 and as bishop of the Diocese of Gary in Indiana from 1984 to 1996.

Biography
Norbert Gaughan was born on May 30, 1921, in Pittsburgh, Pennsylvania.  He was ordained a priest  on November 4, 1945 for the Diocese of Greensburg.

Auxiliary Bishop of Greensburg 
On April 2, 1975, Gaughan was named titular bishop of Taraqua and auxiliary bishop of the Diocese of Greensburg by Pope Paul VI.  He was consecrated by Bishop William G. Connare; Bishop Cyril Vogel and Auxiliary Bishop John McDowellwere the principal co-consecrators.

Bishop of Gary 
On July 24, 1984 John Paul II named Gaughan as the second bishop of the Diocese of Gary..  In February 1992, Gaughan suffered a debilitating stroke.  Because of his health situation, Paul II appointed Bishop Dale Melczek on August 19, 1992, to be the apostolic administrator sede plena of the diocese. On October 28, 1995, Paul II appointed Bishop Melczek to be the coadjutor bishop of the Gary diocese.  This meant that upon Gaughan's retirement, Melczek would succeed him immediately as bishop.

Retirement and legacy 
On June 1, 1996. Paul II accepted Gaughan's resignation as bishop of the Diocese of Gary. Gaughan spent his final years at Saint Anthony Home in Crown Point, Indiana. Norbert Gaughan died on October 1, 1999 in Crown Point.  He was buried in the Saint Emma Convent cemetery in Greensburg, Pennsylvania, after a funeral mass in Gary.

References

1921 births
1999 deaths
20th-century Roman Catholic bishops in the United States
Religious leaders from Pittsburgh
Roman Catholic bishops of Gary